Quanto conficiamur moerore (or simply Quanto conficiamur) is an encyclical of Pope Pius IX, published on August 10, 1863, addressed to the College of Cardinals and Italian Episcopate.

Pius begins by addressing the hostility to the church throughout the world and particularly in Italy with the Piedmontese government. He condemns the errors of modern times and condemns the diffusion of error among some Catholics. He stresses that charity must be given to those outside the church and reproves the error of self-seekingness and materialism. The Pope carries out an energetic condemnation on those ecclesiastics and "certain condemnable societies" of clergy who, with the approval of the government of Piedmont and the Parliament, were in open contempt against the Holy See and spreading false doctrine.

Notably, the encyclical addresses the subject of salvation outside of the church. Beginning by rebuking the belief that eternal salvation could be attained even while "living in error and alienated from the true faith and Catholic unity," Pius recognizes that there are "those who are struggling with invincible ignorance about our most holy religion. Sincerely observing the natural law and its precepts inscribed by God on all hearts and ready to obey God, they live honest lives and are able to attain eternal life by the efficacious virtue of divine light and grace." The Pope then strongly reaffirms the teaching of extra Ecclesiam nulla salus and affirms that those who oppose the teaching of the church or are "stubbornly separated" from it cannot obtain eternal salvation. The encyclical gives praise for those clergy, consecrated virgins, and people of Italy who have remained faithful and ends on a hopeful note.

References

External links 
 The Encyclical Quanto Conficiamur Moerore - The Catholic Church and Salvation

Papal encyclicals
Pope Pius IX